Rising Down is the eighth studio album by the American hip hop band The Roots, released on April 28, 2008, on Def Jam Recordings. The album's title is adapted from William T. Vollmann's book Rising Up and Rising Down: Some Thoughts on Violence, Freedom and Urgent Means (2004). Expanding on the dark, dense production and political tone of Game Theory (2006), Rising Down features lyrical themes concerning issues of contemporary society, including violence, poverty, social and environmental climate, drugs, police corruption and the music industry.

The album debuted at number six on the US Billboard 200 chart, selling 54,000 copies in its first week. It charted modestly in other countries and achieved moderate sales success. On release, Rising Down received generally positive reviews from most music critics. The music critic Robert Christgau named it the ninth best album of 2008. The album has sold 171,000 copies in the United States.

Music and lyrics 
According to the band's producer, Questlove, Rising Down "is an electric record, more synthy. The darks are darker and the lights are lighter. But all I know is making quality hip-hop stylistically. We tried to do something we never did before. Kamal had to be the sacrificial lamb this time. The one instrument that has defined the Roots has been the Fender Rhodes. This is the first year he's had to change his instrumentation and try other sounds out. We have a bunch of keyboards and synthesizers we're using on this record. It feels like the musical equivalent of 'Blade Runner' sometimes. We've also added a horn section."

The album's themes are dark, as on the preceding Game Theory, with Questlove referring to this album as "the most incendiary, political album of our career to date". In the same interview, he explained, "Add up the crime and high school drop-out rates in Philadelphia, plus being in your mid-30s and working 300 nights a year and this being an election year — yeah, all that’s what this album’s about." The album's title comes from William T. Vollmann's 2004 book Rising Up and Rising Down: Some Thoughts on Violence, Freedom and Urgent Means. Similar to the book, the role of violence in human society is a central theme on the overtly political album; its political message reflects the violence in The Roots' home city of Philadelphia.

The album contains a large number of guest vocalists, particularly in comparison to previous Roots albums. It has many of the same guest vocalists as Game Theory. Peedi Crakk, Malik B., Dice Raw, P.O.R.N. and Mercedes Martinez make repeat appearances. The DC rapper Wale appears on the album, following an invitation stemming from a Black Thought-tribute track called "Work" on his 100 Miles & Running mixtape. Other notable featured artists on the album include the Soulquarians members Mos Def, Talib Kweli and Common, as well as Styles P and Saigon.

Release and promotion 
The first track leaked from the album, "75 Bars (Black's Reconstruction)", was posted on Okayplayer on 22 February 2008. The first single was initially confirmed as "Birthday Girl", which features Fall Out Boy's Patrick Stump, and which was leaked on YouTube, a song described by Questlove as "an easy pop song". However, the song went from single to being an iTunes exclusive (bonus track), because it did not fit with the album's motif. "It was just sticking out like a sore thumb...Then we were going to have a 'halftime' thing where it was gonna come in the middle of the record as a break from the political thing, but that didn't work, either. Then we tried to make it the last song on the record, and that wasn't working. Then we tried to make it the hidden track, and that wasn't effective. Basically the album was complete; it starts with 'Rising Down' and it ends with 'Rising Up,' so that makes more sense to me." "Birthday Girl" has been included as a bonus track on iTunes and some international versions of the album, along with "The Grand Return".

Rising Down was first released on April 28, 2008, in the United Kingdom and the next day in the United States, by Def Jam Recordings. In the US, the album debuted at number six on the US Billboard 200 chart and became the highest-selling hip hop album of its debut week, with first-week sales of 54,000 copies. It spent five weeks on the Billboard 200. The album also entered at number one on Billboards Top Rap Albums, ultimately spending 12 weeks on the chart, and at number three on Top R&B/Hip-Hop Albums, ultimately spending 22 weeks on the chart, Elsewhere, the album peaked at number 95 in France, at number 34 in Norway, at number 10 in Switzerland and at number 14 in Canada. By October 2009, Rising Down has sold 171,000 copies in the United States.

Critical reception

Rising Down was met with generally positive reviews. At Metacritic, which assigns a normalized rating out of 100 to reviews from professional critics, the album received an average score of 80, based on 27 reviews. AllMusic writer Marisa Brown gave it 4 out of 5 stars and wrote that it "acts as a powerful statement on contemporary society". Blenders Hsu Hua commended its concise production and called it "an excellent, punchy album full of youthful swagger and anything-goes experimentation". Tom Horan of The Daily Telegraph cited Rising Down as "the best album of their long career". Chicago Tribune writer Greg Kot lauded the album's socially conscious themes and viewed its sound as "bleaker, grimier and harder-edged" than The Roots' earlier work. Will Dukes of Spin complimented its socially relevant themes and called the album "a thematically, unified, musically propulsive statement about the decline of contemporary society". Rolling Stones Jody Rosen complimented its dark, dense production, stating "It's a sound that fits the dark subject matter". Tyler Munro of Sputnikmusic stated "Dark, dense and paranoid, Rising Down is surprisingly better for it".

By contrast, Entertainment Weeklys Sean Howe expressed a mixed response towards its "bad vibes" and lyrical "gripes", calling it "a socially conscious creation overseasoned with discontent". Harry Allen of The Village Voice perceived its dense production as overwhelming Black Thought's rapping and questioned, "is zealous love for the track submerging the band's vocalist?", but commended "the nuances of the Roots' dystopia; the rather painterly way they use sound, in the compositional modes that hip-hop affords, to render a world not only under duress, but, in fact, permanently diseased: Dhalgren on wax". Los Angeles Times writer Oliver Wang viewed that it "doesn't replicate the balanced charm" of Game Theory, but ultimately commended its "musical uniformity" and called it "the more provocative effort". PopMatters writer Zeth Lundy wrote that it "does prove to be an provocative peer of cultural riot-acting and pragmatic contextualization--though, as contemporary pop music, it provides a much more immediate delivery of social ethics from a street-level perspective". Nate Patrin of Pitchfork commended Black Thought's rapping and the album's articulation of lyrical themes concerning contemporary society's issues, stating:

Nate Chinen of The New York Times complimented the album's socially relevant themes and "crisp musicianship", stating "Spiked with dire intensity and stocked with head-spinning rhymes by Black Thought and nearly a dozen guest rappers [...] it’s the most potent Roots release since the one-two punch of Things Fall Apart and its predecessor, Illadelph Halflife". Vibes Keith Murphy commended The Roots' musical ambition and production on the album. USA Todays Steve Jones gave the album four out of four stars and described its sound as "industrial-strength funk that demands to be turned up loud". Slant Magazine's Dave Hughes called it "the most urgently malevolent modern funk record the band has assembled to date". Nathan Rabin of The A.V. Club gave it a B+ rating and praised "the electric chemistry between Black Thought's unrelenting lyrical assault and ?uestlove's epic drums". The Washington Posts Sarah Godfrey viewed that the album's ominous sound "tempers heady subject matter with much-needed thump" and cited it as The Roots' best work since Things Fall Apart. In his consumer guide for MSN Music, critic Robert Christgau gave Rising Down an A rating and called it "as pleasurable as prime OutKast or Kanye West", while citing it as "the most accomplished pure hip-hop album in years". Christgau ranked Rising Down number nine on his list of 2008's best albums. The Boston Globes Sarah Rodman named it the third best album of 2008.

Track listing
Credits adapted from the album's liner notes.

Sample credits
 "Rising Down" contains an interpolation from "Nothing Is the Same", written by Mark Farner.
 "Get Busy" contains excerpts from the "Pee Wee Dance", written by Vincent Davis, Joel Roper, and Chuck Rio, as performed by Joeski Love.
 "I Will Not Apologize" contains excerpts from "Mr. Grammarticalogylisationalism Is The Boss", written and performed by Fela Kuti.

Personnel
Credits for Rising Down adapted from Allmusic.

 A.J. Benson – A&R  
 Jay Brown – A&R  
 Jan Fairchild – vocal engineer  
 Jason Goldstein – engineer, mixing  
 Kenny J. Gravillis – art direction  
 Kevin Hanson – choir, chorus  
 Tahir Jamal – producer  
 Karl Jenkins – A&R  
 Anthony Kilhoffer – engineer  
 David Kutch – mastering  
 Talib Kweli – vocals, choir, chorus  
 Malik B. – vocals  
 Steve Mandel – engineer, mixing, drum recordings  
 Deborah Mannis-Gardner – sample clearance  

 Mel Marcelo – cover illustration  
 Mercedes Martinez – choir, chorus  
 Khari Mateen – producer, engineer  
 Radji Mateen – producer  
 Richard Nichols – producer, executive producer, art direction  
 James Poyser – producer  
 Montez Roberts – engineer  
 Todd Russell – art direction, art coordinator, photo coordination  
 Lenny Santiago – A&R  
 Jon Smeltz – engineer  
 John Stahl – engineer  
 Tim Sturges – assistant engineer, mixing assistant  
 Ahmir Khalib Thompson – drums, choir, chorus, producer, mixing

Charts

Weekly charts

Year-end charts

References

External links
 Rising Down at Discogs
 Rising Down at Metacritic
 The Roots Issue Tracks of Their Fears, and Defiance at The New York Times

2008 albums
Albums produced by Questlove
Def Jam Recordings albums
The Roots albums